Feng Tianwei  is a Singaporean table tennis player. Born in Harbin, China, she permanently moved to Singapore at the age of 20 under the former Foreign Sports Talent Scheme in March 2007 and commenced her international career in competitive table tennis the following month.

Feng represented Singapore for the first time in the Olympic Games at the 2008 Summer Olympics in Beijing. On 15 August 2008, the Singapore team comprising Feng and her teammates Li Jiawei and Wang Yuegu defeated South Korea 3–2 in the semifinals. The team lost to China in the final, obtaining the silver medal. This was Singapore's first Olympic medal in 48 years and its first as an independent nation.

At the 2012 Summer Olympics in London, Feng defeated Kasumi Ishikawa of Japan 4–0 to win the women's singles bronze medal, Singapore's first Olympic singles medal since the 1960 Summer Olympics. She would later won the bronze medal at the women's team event with Li and Wang against South Korea. This was the first time Singapore had won two medals at an Olympic Games.

On 15 March 2015, Feng defeated Zhu Yuling and Liu Shiwen at the 2015 Asian Cup in Jaipur to be crowned Asian Cup Champion for the first time. At the same time, she broke China's 7 consecutive years of dominance in this tournament.

On 25 October 2016, the Singapore Table Tennis Association announced that it would not be renewing its contract with Feng, citing the need for rejuvenation of the national team. However, STTA has confirmed to support her for future international competitions if she meets the selection criteria. A few months after her exit from STTA, she went on to beat then world number one and Olympic gold medalist Ding Ning 3–2 in the Chinese Table Tennis Super League.

On 11 October 2019, Feng defeated Chen Meng, then ranked world number one, in 4 straight games, causing the biggest upset in the 2019 German Open.

Early years
Feng was born on 31 August 1986 in Harbin, Heilongjiang, People's Republic of China. She is the only daughter of Feng Qingzhi, a granary worker, and his wife Li Chunping, an employee of a department store. Feng's parents, who were poor, lived frugally for years to pay for her table tennis training. Her father suffered from multiple sclerosis, but she was not told how severe his illness was. He died in 2002, weeks before Feng tried out for China's national B squad. Although Feng topped the qualifying matches a month later and was called up for the national team in 2003, she suffered from a long illness; a source close to her said it was "because she missed her father too much". Feng left China in 2005 to play in the Japanese professional league. While there she was spotted by Liu Guodong, then a coach with the Singapore Table Tennis Association, in 2006. In March 2007 she was invited to train in Singapore under the Foreign Sports Talent Scheme. She became a Singapore citizen in January 2008.

Career as national player
Feng made her international début for Singapore in June 2007 as an under-21 player at the International Table Tennis Federation (ITTF) Pro Tour Volkswagen Korean Open. As a singles player, Feng was ranked 73rd in the world in August 2007.

In 2007, she achieved a silver medal in the singles at the ITTF Pro Tour Chinese Taipei Open, her compatriot Li beating her to take the gold.

Feng was a member of the silver medal-winning team at the World Team Championships in Guangzhou in 2008 and defeated the top seed Zhang Yining from China in the Quarter-finals of the Asian Cup held in Sapporo between 29 and 30 March 2008, eventually achieving second place behind China's Guo Yue. She rose to the top 10 world rankings within a year.

2008 Summer Olympics
Feng represented Singapore for the first time at the 2008 Summer Olympics in the women's team tournament. She contributed to Singapore's 3–2 win against South Korea in the semifinals by defeating Dang Ye-Seo and Park Mi-Young in two singles matches. Feng's match against Park was closely fought, with Feng eventually overcoming Park 3–1. Singapore was assisted by the implementation of the expedite system when the game failed to be completed in ten minutes. The system unsettled Park, and Feng won two minutes after its introduction in the match when Park committed a service fault. Interviewed afterwards, Feng said: "I definitely did not expect that [Park's error]. It was a surprise and the best birthday present I've ever gotten."

On 17 August 2008, Feng and her teammates achieved a silver medal in women's table tennis after losing to China in three matches. Feng played the starting singles match, winning the first game but eventually losing to China's Wang Nan 1–3. This was the first time Singapore had won an Olympic medal since its independence in 1965. The medal came 48 years after Tan Howe Liang won the country's first medal, a silver in weightlifting in the lightweight category at the 1960 Summer Olympics in Rome.

Feng received byes into the third round of the women's singles tournament. Feng defeated South Korea's Dang Ye-Seo 4–0 in the third round, Netherlands' Li Jie 4–1 in the fourth round, but fell 1–4 to China's Zhang Yining in the quarter-finals. Feng made the world number one work for her win, with the final scores being 11–13, 14–12, 12–14, 10–12, 11–13. According to the Straits Times, Zhang leveraged on her experience by stalling for time at crucial stages of the game, which broke Feng's rhythm. Interviewed after the match, Feng said: "I'm sure I'll win a medal at the next Olympics."

At a victory celebration in Singapore on 25 August 2008, Vivian Balakrishnan, the Minister for Community Development, Youth and Sports, announced that Feng, Li and Wang would be presented with the Pingat Jasa Gemilang (Meritorious Service Medal).

Competitions between 2008 and 2012
On 9 September 2008, Feng beat her compatriot Wang to clinch the bronze medal at the ITTF Women's World Cup in Kuala Lumpur. Despite crashing out of the singles event earlier, Feng and her teammates Li and Wang won the top title at the ITTF Pro Tour ERKE German Open in Berlin on 22 November 2008. Feng won her first professional singles title at the Polish Open in Warsaw on 30 November 2008, in an all-Singapore final against Wang. Feng and Yu Mengyu also took silver in the doubles. On 2 December 2008, the ITTF announced that Feng was ranked sixth in the world. This made her the top Singapore female table tennis player and the highest-ranked player in the world not representing China. She was third in Today newspaper's list of athletes of the year for 2008.

On 23 August 2009, Feng achieved her second Pro Tour singles title at the KAL Cup Korean Open in Seoul.

Feng took part in the 25th Southeast Asian Games in Vientiane, Laos. She was a member of the Singapore women's team with Sun Beibei and Wang that defeated Thailand 3–0 to win Gold on 10 December 2009. On 14 December 2009, she and her partner Wang were defeated by compatriots Sun and Yu in an all-Singapore final in the women's doubles. The following day, in her maiden appearance at the Games, she achieved gold in the singles competition after defeating Wang 4–1.

The Singapore Table Tennis Association made Feng the inaugural winner of its Best Player of the Year award on 12 February 2010. As of 8 April 2010, she had worked her way up to a second-place ranking in the world. On 3 May 2010, the Singapore National Olympic Council named her Sportswoman of the Year for 2009. The national table tennis women's team, composed of Feng, Li, Wang and Sun were awarded the Team of the Year prize at the Singapore Sports Awards.

Together with Sun and Wang, Feng was a member of the team at the Liebherr World Team Table Tennis Championships in Moscow that defeated China, 17-time winner and the reigning world champion, with a score of 3–1. In the two games she played, Feng defeated Liu Shiwen and Ding Ning, ranked number one and four in the world respectively and Wang contributing another point to the team by defeating Liu Shiwen. This was the first time Singapore had lifted the Corbillon cup.

2012 Summer Olympics
Feng represented Singapore at the 2012 Summer Olympics in London, and was the nation's flagbearer at the Parade of Nations segment of the opening ceremony. She entered the women's singles competition seeded sixth, and progressed until she was defeated 2-4 by China's Ding Ning in the semi-finals. She won against Kasumi Ishikawa of Japan 4–0 (11–9, 11–6, 11–6, 11–5) to take the bronze medal, becoming the second Singaporean to win an individual Olympic medal. Interviewed after her win, Feng said: "I'm really happy, although I feel it's come a little too suddenly. My form wasn't very good lately, so I didn't dare to carry too much expectations coming into the London Olympics. It was just a relief to win."

Feng also participated in the women's team competition with Li and Wang. They were beaten 0–3 by Japan in the semifinals, but took the bronze medal by edging out South Korea 3–0. Feng defeated Kim Kyung Ah 11–9, 11–8, 4–11, 13–11, Li also successfully fended off Seok Ha Jung 11–5, 11–8, 6–11, 11–8. Li and Wang then succeeded in the doubles game against Seok and Dang Ye Seo 11–9, 11–6, 6–11, 11–5. This marked the first time Singapore had won more than one medal at an Olympic Games. Feng commented: "Against Japan, we gave ourselves too much pressure and lost the psychological battle. After that, I told myself that I must prepare myself well mentally and it's only when I do what I'm capable of that I can win."

Singles Event

Team Event

2013
Feng participated in many tournaments in 2013, achieving commendable results in several competitions. Notable ones include the Kuwait Open, 2013 World Table Tennis Championships and the 2013 Women's World Cup.

2013 Kuwait Open
Feng participated in the 2013 Kuwait Open as the fourth seed in the women singles competition. She ended up as the runner-up, losing out to China's Liu Shiwen. In the semifinals, Feng, then world ranked 6th, stunned then world number one Ding Ning from China in an epic encounter that finished 4-3 in favour of Feng.

2013 World Table Tennis Championships
Feng qualified for the women singles event of the 2013 World Table Tennis Championships as the fourth seed. She progressed to the quarterfinals as one of the only remaining players outside of China, before losing out to China's fifth seeded Zhu Yuling. She also participated in the women's doubles event with Yu Mengyu. Feng and Yu impressively secured the joint bronze medal alongside Chinese pair Chen Meng and Zhu Yuling.

Singles

Doubles (with Yu Mengyu)

2013 Women's World Cup
Feng participated in the 2013 Women's World Cup and progressed to the semifinals, before losing out to Wu Yang of China. However, she defeated Hong Kong's Jiang Huajun in the bronze medal playoff, thereby attaining the bronze medal.

2014
Feng notched impressive results in 2014, winning several titles such as the Philippines Open, Australia Open, and most notably, Japan Open titles. She also attained the runner-up position in the Korea Open.

Feng also impressed at the 2014 Commonwealth Games, winning the gold medal in the Women's singles event, Women's doubles event with Yu Mengyu, and the Women's team event, alongside teammates Yu Mengyu, Lin Ye, Zhou Yihan and Isabelle Li.

At the 2014 Asian Games, Feng secured two bronzes, one in the Women's singles event and the other in the Women's team event. Feng also led the Singapore Women's team to a bronze medal in the 2014 World Team Table Tennis Championships.

At the year-end ITTF Star Awards, Feng was nominated for the Female Table Tennis Star award, alongside star players Ding Ning, Liu Shiwen and Kasumi Ishikawa.

2014 World Team Table Tennis Championships
Feng led the Singapore women's team comprising Yu Mengyu, Isabelle Li and Yee Herng Hwee to a bronze medal in the 2014 World Team Table Tennis Championships. Impressively, Feng won 10 out of 11 matches that she played throughout the tournament, losing only to China's Li Xiaoxia in the semifinals.

Overall Team results

Individual breakdown of Feng's matches

2014 Korea Open
Feng participated in the 2014 Korea Open and advanced all the way to the finals, where she lost to Germany's Han Ying. On route to the final, she notably defeated China's rising star Wang Manyu, as well as teammate Yu Mengyu.

2014 Japan Open
Feng participated in the 2014 Japan Open, a Super Series tournament, and clinched the gold medal after defeating Japan's Kasumi Ishikawa in the final. It was Feng's third title of the year, having won the 2014 Philippines Open and 2014 Australia Open, and also a week after coming in second place in the 2014 Korea Open.

2014 Asian Games
Feng participated in the Women's singles and Women's team event at the 2014 Asian Games. She managed to clinch the bronze medal in the singles event, and managed to lead the Singapore women's team to a bronze medal at the women's team event.

Singles event

Team event

2016 Summer Olympics
Feng participated in ITTF Asian-Olympics Qualifier (South-East Asian region) at Hong Kong from 13 to 17 April 2016. She was the winner for SEA group and was given a direct entry to the singles event at Rio de Janeiro Olympics, her third Olympics appearance. In the qualifier match, She defeated Nanthana Komwong in the Quarter-Finals, Suthasini Sawettabut in Semi-Finals & Yu in the Finals.

According to July world ranking published by ITTF, Feng was seeded second in Olympics singles. This was her highest-ever Olympic seeding. The team consisting of herself, Yu and Zhou was seeded fourth. She reached the singles Quarter-Final but lost to Ai Fukuhara of Japan in 4 straight games. Feng, Yu and Zhou reached the semi-final of the team event but lost to China 0–3. In the bronze medal match, the trio was defeated by Japan 1–3.

Singles Event

Team Event

2019 Women's World Cup 
Feng defeated Bernadette Szőcs and Kasumi Ishikawa before losing to Zhu Yuling, 4-0, 4-3, and 2-4 respectively. She took the bronze medal after defeating Lily Zhang with a 4-1 score.

2020 Women's World Cup 
In the first ITTF event since the hiatus caused by the coronavirus pandemic, Feng was upset by Zhang. However, she later beat Zhang in a rematch in WTT Macau.

2020 Summer Olympics
The 2020 Summer Olympics was Feng's fourth appearance at the Olympic Games, having participated in the 2008, 2012 and 2016 Olympic Games, winning a silver medal and a bronze medal in the Team Event in the 2008 Summer Olympics and 2012 Summer Olympics respectively, as well as a singles bronze in 2012. According to July's Olympic Qualification Ranking published by the International Table Tennis Federation, Feng was seeded sixth in the singles event.

Feng received a bye in Round 1 and Round 2 due to her seeding. In Round 3, she defeated Spain's María Xiao, coming from 0-1 down to win 4-1. In the Round of 16, Feng faced Germany's Han Ying, an opponent she had not defeated before in all her previous four international encounters. Han won a tight first game 13-11, followed by an equally close 11-7 and 11-9 victory in games two and three, putting her 3-0 up. Feng fought back and took the next game 11-8 and led 7-3 in the fifth, but was unable to close out the game, which Han eventually won 11-8. Despite a valiant effort, Feng's singles campaign ended in a 1-4 defeat to Han Ying in the Round of 16.

In the team event, Feng, together with Yu Mengyu and Lin Ye, defeated 13th seeded France 3-0 in the Round of 16, progressing to the quarterfinals. In the second match, Feng made a comeback from 0-2 down to win 3-2 against Prithika Pavade. In the quarterfinals, the 6th seeded Singapore team was handed an unfavourable draw against favourites China, the top seed and eventual gold medallists in the Women's Team event. In the first match (doubles), Yu and Lin lost 0-3 (5-11, 7-11, 5-11) to Chen Meng and Wang Manyu. In the second match, a close first and third game saw Feng lose 0-3 (8-11, 3-11, 8-11) to Sun Yingsha, who was the silver medallist in the Singles event. Olympics debutant Lin then lost the third match to Wang (11-6, 9-11, 6-11, 5-11), after a solid first game win. This wrapped up a 3-0 victory for China and signalled the end of Singapore's Table Tennis campaign in the 2020 Summer Olympics. It also marked the end of Feng Tianwei's Olympic table tennis career.

Singles Event

Team Event

2021 
In March, Feng played at WTT Doha. She suffered an early-round upset in WTT Contender, but made it to the finals in the WTT Star Contender event, where she lost to Mima Ito of Japan. As a result of her finals run, Feng passed Kasumi Ishikawa in projected Olympic seeding and put herself in a strong position to take the Olympic fourth seed from Cheng I-ching.

2022 
Feng took part in the  2022 Commonwealth Games held in Birmingham. She won three golds in the women's team, singles and doubles events. In the singles event, she came back from three sets down to beat compatriot Zeng Jian 4-3 in an all-Singapore final.   She partnered Zeng Jian to defeat the Australian duo Jee Minhyung and Jian Fang Lay 3-0 in the finals.

Feng was also awarded the David Dixon Award, presented to the Commonwealth Games athlete who showcases an exceptional level of performance, commitment and fair play. She is the first Singaporean to win this award.

Major tournament performance timeline

(W) won; (F) finalist; (SF) semi-finalist; (QF) quarter-finalist; (#R) rounds 4, 3, 2, 1; (RR) round-robin stage; (S) singles event; (WD) Women's doubles event; (XD) mixed doubles event; (T) team event.

Key career records
Legend :   Gold  Silver  Bronze     QR: Qualifying Round

References

External links
 

Official website of the Singapore National Olympic Council
Official website of the Singapore Table Tennis Association
Official website of Team Singapore, managed by the Singapore Sports Council
Feng Tianwei at Facebook
 
 
 

1986 births
Living people
Table tennis players from Harbin
Chinese emigrants to Singapore
Singaporean sportspeople of Chinese descent
People who lost Chinese citizenship
Naturalised citizens of Singapore
Naturalised table tennis players
Chinese female table tennis players
Singaporean female table tennis players
Asian Games medalists in table tennis
Commonwealth Games gold medallists for Singapore
Commonwealth Games silver medallists for Singapore
Olympic medalists in table tennis
Olympic bronze medalists for Singapore
Olympic silver medalists for Singapore
Olympic table tennis players of Singapore
Recipients of the Pingat Jasa Gemilang
Table tennis players at the 2008 Summer Olympics
Table tennis players at the 2010 Commonwealth Games
Table tennis players at the 2012 Summer Olympics
Table tennis players at the 2016 Summer Olympics
Table tennis players at the 2020 Summer Olympics
Medalists at the 2012 Summer Olympics
Medalists at the 2008 Summer Olympics
Table tennis players at the 2010 Asian Games
Table tennis players at the 2014 Commonwealth Games
Table tennis players at the 2014 Asian Games
Asian Games silver medalists for Singapore
Asian Games bronze medalists for Singapore
Commonwealth Games medallists in table tennis
Medalists at the 2010 Asian Games
Medalists at the 2014 Asian Games
Table tennis players at the 2018 Commonwealth Games
Table tennis players at the 2022 Commonwealth Games
Southeast Asian Games gold medalists for Singapore
Southeast Asian Games silver medalists for Singapore
Southeast Asian Games medalists in table tennis
World Table Tennis Championships medalists
Table tennis players at the 2018 Asian Games
Competitors at the 2009 Southeast Asian Games
Competitors at the 2011 Southeast Asian Games
Competitors at the 2015 Southeast Asian Games
Competitors at the 2017 Southeast Asian Games
Singaporean expatriate sportspeople in Japan
Chinese expatriate sportspeople in Japan
Competitors at the 2019 Southeast Asian Games
Expatriate table tennis people in Japan
Medallists at the 2010 Commonwealth Games
Medallists at the 2014 Commonwealth Games
Medallists at the 2018 Commonwealth Games
Medallists at the 2022 Commonwealth Games